Laurie Kutchins is an American poet.

Life
She grew up in Wyoming.  She graduated from Carleton College, and from the University of Massachusetts Amherst's MFA Program for Poets & Writers.

She is an Associate Professor in the English Department at James Madison University.  She has also been a visiting writer at the University of New Mexico, and a faculty member of the Taos Summer Writers Conference.

Her work appeared in The New Yorker, The Georgia Review, Ploughshares, The Kenyon Review, The Southern Review, Poetry, West Branch, Denver Quarterly, and LIT.

She lives in Singers Glen, Virginia.

Awards

 Isabella Gardner Award for Poetry
 Texas Tech University Press First Book Award (1993)

Fellowships and grants
 Two fellowships from the Virginia Council on the Arts
 Two fellowships from the Pennsylvania Commission on the Arts
 Educational Leave and Research grants from James Madison University
 MacDowell Colony residency
 Ucross Foundation residency
 Virginia Center for the Creative Arts residency

Books

Anthologies
 A Tough and Tender Kinship (anthology)

References

20th-century American poets
Living people
James Madison University faculty
Carleton College alumni
University of Massachusetts Amherst MFA Program for Poets & Writers alumni
American women poets
Poets from Wyoming
Poets from Virginia
21st-century American poets
20th-century American women writers
21st-century American women writers
University of New Mexico faculty
Year of birth missing (living people)
American women academics